Ammonium chromate is a salt with the formula (NH4)2CrO4. It forms yellow, monoclinic crystals; made from ammonium hydroxide and ammonium dichromate; used in photography as a sensitizer for gelatin coatings. It is often used in photography, textile printing, and fixing chromate dyes on wool. It is also used as an analytical reagent, catalyst, and corrosion inhibitor. It is soluble in water, and, when applied, can cause irritation in the mucous membrane, eyes, respiratory tract, skin, etc. It may cause skin sensitization after prolonged contact. It is also known to be carcinogenic (cancer-causing), and it can cause tissue ulceration and injury to the liver and kidneys.

See also

Ammonium dichromate

References

Ammonium compounds
Chromates